The following events occurred in December 1953:

December 1, 1953 (Tuesday)

December 2, 1953 (Wednesday)
The United Kingdom and Iran reform diplomatic relations.
Died: Tran Trong Kim, Vietnamese historian and Prime Minister of the Empire of Vietnam (b. 1883)

December 3, 1953 (Thursday)

December 4, 1953 (Friday)

December 5, 1953 (Saturday)
 A violent F5 tornado devastates parts of Vicksburg, Mississippi.

December 6, 1953 (Sunday)
With the NBC Symphony Orchestra, conductor Arturo Toscanini performs what he claims is his favorite Beethoven symphony, Eroica, for the last time. The live performance is broadcast nationwide on radio, and later released on records and CD.

December 7, 1953 (Monday)
A visit to Iran by American Vice President Richard Nixon sparks several days of riots, as a reaction to the August 19 overthrow of the government of Mohammed Mossadegh by the US-backed Shah. Three students are shot dead by police in Tehran. This event becomes an annual commemoration, Student Day.

December 8, 1953 (Tuesday)
U.S. president Dwight D. Eisenhower delivers his Atoms for Peace address to the United Nations General Assembly in New York City.

December 9, 1953 (Wednesday)
Born:
John Malkovich, American actor, in Christopher, Illinois
Hiromitsu Ochiai, Japanese baseball player and manager

December 10, 1953 (Thursday)
The Nobel Prizes are awarded in Stockholm, Sweden. Frits Zernike of the Netherlands wins for Physics, Hermann Staudinger of West Germany for Chemistry, Hans Adolf Krebs of England and Fritz Albert Lipmann of the United States for Physiology or Medicine, Sir Winston Leonard Spencer Churchill of England for Literature. In Oslo, Norway, Albert Schweitzer of France is awarded the Peace Prize.

December 11, 1953 (Friday)

December 12, 1953 (Saturday)

December 13, 1953 (Sunday)

December 14, 1953 (Monday)

December 15, 1953 (Tuesday)

December 16, 1953 (Wednesday)

December 17, 1953 (Thursday)
The U.S. Federal Communications Commission (FCC) approves color television (using the NTSC standard).

December 18, 1953 (Friday)

December 19, 1953 (Saturday)

December 20, 1953 (Sunday)

December 21, 1953 (Monday)

December 22, 1953 (Tuesday)

December 23, 1953 (Wednesday)
The Soviet Union announces officially that Lavrentiy Beria has been executed.

December 24, 1953 (Thursday)
Tangiwai disaster: A railway bridge collapses at Tangiwai, New Zealand, sending a fully loaded passenger train into the Whangaehu River; 151 are killed.

December 25, 1953 (Friday)
The Amami Islands are returned to Japan after 8 years of United States military occupation.
Died:
William Haselden, Spanish cartoonist (b. 1872)
Lee Shubert, Polish-born theater owner and operator (b. 1871)

December 26, 1953 (Saturday)

December 27, 1953 (Sunday)

December 28, 1953 (Monday)

December 29, 1953 (Tuesday)

December 30, 1953 (Wednesday)
The first color television sets go on sale for about US$1,175 – RCA Model 5 Prototype, which became CT-100, and Admiral C1617A.

December 31, 1953 (Thursday)

References

1953
1953-12
1953-12